Baby Ray is a band from Cambridge, Massachusetts that was formed in the 1996 from members of the band Brain Helicopter.  The founding members are Ken Lafler and Erich Groat (also of Willard Grant Conspiracy).  Their sound carries a pop sensibility, while still adhering to the alternative style of rock from the 90's. The Boston Phoenix described the band's music as a "clever kind of contortionist pop, with its pretzel-shaped melodies and impishly bratty wordplay".

Discography
 Monkey Puzzle (Thirsty Ear, 1998)
 Do I Love America (Thirsty Ear, 1999)
 Demonstration (self-released promo, 2001)
 Low Rises (Dren, 2006)

References

External links
Perry, Jonathan (2006) "Three unique bands celebrate CDs in an extraordinary way", The Boston Globe
Baker, Brian (2008) "Baby Ray Low Rises review", Pop Culture Press
David Lee Beowulf "Baby Ray Do I Love America" (review), Ink19

Rock music groups from Massachusetts
Thirsty Ear Recordings artists